The Massachusetts Constitutional Convention of 1820–1821 met in order to consider amendments to the Constitution of Massachusetts. It resulted in the adoption of the first nine amendments. Several other proposals were rejected.

Background 
Modernization and demographic changes put severe strain on the system set up in the 1780 constitution. New England was the epicenter of the American Industrial Revolution,  and urbanization in mill towns and coastal ports led to cities several times larger than seen before in Massachusetts. Apportionment of the General Court was one of the biggest issues leading to calls for a convention. Under the old constitution all towns in Massachusetts were entitled to a representative, with the most populous towns entitled to a few extra representatives. The growth of larger urban towns like Boston caused greater dis-proportionality within this system, and the continual increase in the number of towns in the western part of the state meant the legislature had reached a large size. A smaller problem also occurred reapportioning the seats previously sent by Maine, which had been granted statehood in 1820. The convention sought to produce a more proportional legislature while reducing the size of the House and Senate.

Articles and results 
The Constitutional Convention presented fourteen articles for the people's consideration:

First Article 
Changed the constitutional support of public worship and appointment of public teachers to include all Christian denominations, not just Protestant. Provided that all church taxes raised in the State may go to the denomination of one's choosing, instead of only to the Congregational Church.

Also provided that no person may be imprisoned or brought to trial without an indictment by a Grand Jury.

Second Article 
Moved the start of the political year from the first Wednesday of May to the first Wednesday of January. All elected officials would start their yearly term starting on that date in January. The article also moved the date of the yearly state election to the second Monday of November from the first Monday of April.

Third Article 
Provided that if the General Court adjourned before the deadline the Governor had to return a rejected bill, then the law would not be passed.

Fourth Article 
Allowed the state to establish city forms of government for towns over 12,000 inhabitants. It provided for the legislature to draft laws to allow these cities to have different forms of governance than the traditional town meeting.

Fifth Article 
Reduced the number of the Senate from 40 members to 36.

It also changed the apportionment for the House of Representatives.  Under the article all towns over 1,200 people would be entitled to one representative, with an additional representative given for every 2,400 residents. All towns under 1,200 residents could choose to either be grouped with a second town to annually elect a representative, or choose to remain separate and elect a representative biennially and only be represented every other year. The article also capped the House's size to 275 members and allowed the legislature to raise the number of residents per representative every 10 years to compensate for population growth.

Provided the House to be paid out from the treasury, and set their quorum to 100 members. All members of the General Court were exempt from arrest when performing their duties as elected officials.

Reduced the number of members of the Governor's Council from nine to seven and set their quorum. It provided that the General Court shall elect them by joint ballot from among the people at large, instead of from the members of the legislature as it had been before.

Sixth Article 
Eliminated almost all property and tax restrictions for voting, the exception being paupers. All male citizens over 21 who had resided in the state for one year were entitled to vote.

Seventh Article 
Provided for the gubernatorial appointment of notaries public, the Commissary General, and vacancies for the Secretary and Treasurer.

Eighth Article 
Allowed men serving in the militia, but under the age of 21, to vote for their company Captains and Subalterns the same as men over the age of 21.

Ninth Article 
Amended the process of removing judicial officers, including justices of the peace.

Forbade the Governor and Legislature from soliciting the legal opinion of the Supreme Judicial Court.

Tenth Article 
Allowed the positions reserved for ministers of churches on the Harvard Board of Overseers to be open to all christian denominations. Harvard at the time was publicly funded and prior to this amendment it selected board members from the congregational church.

Eleventh Article 
Amended the oath of allegiance required for all public officials to hold office. It provided an exception for Quakers who refuse to swear oaths.

Twelfth Article 
Specified that no other oath or declaration was required to hold public office except for the one provided for in the eleventh article.

Thirteenth Article 
Forbade state judges from holding any other state office. Forbade anyone holding a state office from holding a federal office other than postmaster.

Fourteenth Article 
Changed the process for amending the Constitution. It required a vote of one-half of Senators and two-thirds of Representatives to vote positively on an amendment in two consecutive sessions. It would then be presented to the voters for approval.

List of delegates
The participants included:

Boston

 William Gray
 Isaac Parker
 Josiah Quincy
 Charles Jackson
 Peter Chardon Brooks

Dedham

 John Endicott

Saugus

 Jonathan Makepeace

References

Works cited

1820 in Massachusetts
1821 in Massachusetts
History of Massachusetts
Political history of Massachusetts
Massachusetts law
Government of Massachusetts